Stephens' banded snake (Hoplocephalus stephensii) is a species of highly venomous tree snake in the family Elapidae. The species is endemic to Australia.

Taxonomy
Gerard Krefft described Hoplocephalus stephensii as a species new to science in 1869. The specific name stephensii, is in honour of Australian academic William John Stephens.

Description
This species of snake grows up to 1 meter in length, with some specimens having been recorded being an upwards of 120cm long. The Stephens' banded snake is the largest species within the Hoplocephalus genus, weighing up to 250g as an adult. On average, the females of this species are larger than males. This slight sexual dimorphism is an adaptation that likely improves the reproductive capabilities of females. 

The anterior scalation of Stephens' banded snake consists of 21 rows of midbody scales, 220 to 250 ventral scales and their singular subcaudal scales can range between 50-70 scales from the anal plate to the tip of the tail. This species has a singular anal plate that covers its cloacal opening. The ventral scales of the Hoplocephalus genus differs from other elapids as they have lateral notches along the caudal border of each of these scales. This adaptation aids with gripping onto branches whilst climbing. Additionally, the occipital scales on the head of this snake are elongated.

The body of the Stephens' banded snake is adorned with alternating grey or black and dirty-white bands of colouration on the dorsal side of the snake. These snakes may have over 40 of each colour band from the back of the head to the tip of the tail. Whilst the flat and quadrangular belly of the snake is mostly dirty-white with occasional splotches of grey towards the head and tail end of the snake. The top of this species’ head is typically dark brown in colouration, and they have pale blotches or bars of patterning along their lips.

The morphological composition of a slender body and broadened arrow-shaped head also allows for more agile locomotion in an arboreal habitat whilst also having the capability of predating on a large range of species within the ecosystem. This unique body plan essentially reduces metabolic costs, allowing the snakes to retain energy for longer periods of time.

Distribution and habitat

The Stephens' banded snake is endemic to the east coast of Australia. The distribution of these snakes spans from its northern most range in the Kroombit tops of south-eastern Queensland down to the Gosford Area of New South Wales.  Within this coastal range, the species is typically restricted to high-rainfall remnant forest regions, secluded from human intervention. The Stephens' banded snake can be found up to an altitude of 950m above sea level within their geographical range. Studies on the habitat preferences of This species has found that they prefer to reside around 20 metres high in canopy trees.  

These snakes have a broad tolerance for variations in abiotic and biotic factors such as vegetal communities and climatic changes within the constraints of their remnant forest habitats. The species will favour areas with less rugged terrain as well as hollow bearing trees, dense understory vegetation or rocky outcrops that they may utilise to seek refuge.

Individual male Stephens' banded snakes occupy an average home range of 20.2 ha. Whilst the females of the species have a much smaller average home range of 5.4 ha. This difference is likely due to the fact that males may venture out of their typical territories in order to find a viable mate.

Behavior 
Stephens' banded snakes have been described as having a nervous and defensive temperament towards other animals. These snakes are relatively solitary animals, only voluntarily interacting with other individuals of the same species during mating season, in which males will actively pursue females to reproduce. If females are apprehensive to reproduce upon the pursuit of potential mates, they may assume a stereotypical posture that is used to prevent males from engaging in copulation. The female will form a tight coil with its body, with its vent in the centre coil, out of reach from the male.

Stephens' banded snakes are one of the only predominantly arboreal elapid species in Australia. Other Australian elapidae that exhibit similar arboreality include the broad-headed snake and the pale-headed snake, both of which belong to the Hoplocephalus genus. Stephens’ banded snakes are also capable of living a terrestrial lifestyle depending on the available resources in their environment. The species is nocturnal; thus, they spend a large portion of the day sequestering in the canopy tree hollows within the mesic forests in which they reside. The Stephens' banded snake displays significant reluctance with their heliothermic behaviours. Due to their small size they are at risk of predation. Therefore, these snakes will spend minimal time basking amongst the branches of trees. Typically, they are semi-covered by foliage so as to offer some means of concealment whilst in this vulnerable position. A study on the basking behaviours of Hoplocephalus stephensii has revealed that the species only prefers to overtly bask when they are either in late stages of pregnancy, have just fed or are in the process of undergoing ecdysis. 

Throughout the winter season, Stephens' banded snakes stop feeding and undergo brumation in the protection of tree hollows for up to 5 months. During this period of time, their metabolism is significantly slowed, allowing them to conserve energy. These animals are cold blooded, so they are only able to resume digestive processes when temperatures rise again in their environment. Studies on the survivable temperature threshold of these snakes has revealed that their body temperatures may fluctuate anywhere between 11.1 °C to 37.8 °C depending on the climatic conditions. The typical diurnal body temperature of this snake species averages at 28.4°C.

The species is at its most active in their natural habitat between the months of September to May. Stephens' banded snakes are highly vagile and may use up to 30 different trees within its range. Territories of individuals may overlap. Despite this, they avoid conspecific encounters.

Life cycle 
Studies suggest that Stephens' banded snakes evolved to live a low energy and slow life cycle in response to limited food availability and low temperatures along the snake's geographical range. Males of the species only reach sexual maturity at 3 years of age, whilst females may only reach sexual maturity after 4 years. In Addition, individual females are only gravid every two years and give birth to relatively small litters in comparison to other Australian elapids. Through observations of captive Stephens' banded snakes, scientists were able to note that the species engaged in reproductive behaviours during the spring season. Stephens' banded snakes are viviparous, and the species has been recorded to have anywhere between 1 and 9 offspring per litter. In wild populations the average generational length for Stephens' banded snakes is 8 years.

Diet 
Stephen's banded snakes are nocturnal predators. They are infrequent feeders and have a generalist approach to hunting methods. By implementing a combination of active searching and ambush strategies, they are able to obtain a wide range of prey including; bush rats, pygmy possums, and other small lizards, mice and frogs. Studies have observed that these snakes prefer to inhabit tree hollows that are frequented by small mammalians, often times coiling amongst rodent nests waiting for their potential prey to return.  

Prey options within the habitat of Stephens’ banded snakes vary on a seasonal basis. The small size of these snakes means that they are unable to feed on the adult variants of most prey species. Instead, they seasonally hunt juveniles of different animals throughout the year as their limited mouth gape prevents them from predating on larger prey.

The neonatal size of this species is large compared to other juvenile elapids, measuring an average of 25cm in length. This large size is advantageous at a young age as they are readily capable of consuming a wider variety of species including small ectotherms and rodents that live in their resource poor environment.

Venom

The Stephens' banded snake has been described as a ready biter with their subsequent envenoming being potentially fatal. The venom of Hoplocephalus stephensii is a procoagulant and has typically been described as exhibiting a defibrination-type coagulopathy in patients. Therefore, envenomation will result in a reaction known as venom-induced consumption coagulopathy (VICC). Systemic symptoms of VICC include; nausea and headaches, abdominal pain, vomiting and diarrhoea as well as diaphoresis. The venom contains prothrombinase, a complex that prompts the production of the thrombin enzyme in the blood. This enzymatic reaction induces micro clotting in the bloodstream of their victims. Effectually, this blocks the flow of blood throughout the body. If left untreated, the clotting will cause blood vessels to rupture. Consequentially, the envenomated victim will experience excessive bleeding.  

Presently, no anti-venom has been derived from the venom of the Stephens’ banded snake. Despite this, it has been documented that victims of this snake’s envenomation have been successfully treated using up to 4 doses of 3,000 unit tiger snake anti-venom. Despite the lethality of this snake's venom, there has only been one recorded fatality of envenomation. The victim of this fatal encounter was an elderly man in his 60s from the town of Kalang in NSW. Due to torrential rain and flood conditions, a team of SES, ambulance and police rescue worked together to reach and transport the wounded man to John Hunter Hospital. However, medical assistance was unable to remediate him in time.

Genetics 
Genetic research pertaining to the molecular phylogeny of the Hoplocephalus genus has revealed that Stephens’ banded snakes displays up to 2.6–3.1% in genetic divergence with the broad-headed snake (Hoplocephalus bungaroides), making these two coastal species the most closely related within the genus. Whereas, the pale-headed snake (Hoplocephalus bitorquatus) a more inland relative, genetically diverges up to 7.8–8.3% with Stephens' banded snake. Hoplocephalus stephensii displays low genetic diversity amongst extant populations. Wild populations of the species exhibit 9 different mitochondrial haplotypes. Within Individual populations, the snakes may exhibit anywhere between 1 to 3 haplotypes with single base pairing differences. Throughout the entire wild population of Stephens' banded snakes, the largest genetic divergence has been observed between the far north and far south populations with a 1.7% sequence divergence. Through genetic analysis, scientists have determined that these populations of Stephens' banded snakes separated from each other approximately 850,000 years ago.

Threats and conservation 

Stephens' banded snakes are listed as near threatened in the IUCN Red List. In the last 200 years since the onset of European colonisation in Australia, this species has experienced a steady decline in population. Scientists have been able to use radiometric tracking technology in order to study the movement patterns of Stephens' banded snakes throughout their natural habitat. These studies have suggested that the declining populations of the species is primarily due to Habitat fragmentation coupled with a low fecundity and growth rate. This is a result of anthropogenic disturbances such as deforestation and habitat encroachment by urban developments as well as livestock farming. Due to the rarity of these snakes, the illegal capturing of wild specimens for commercial use has proven to be detrimental to the survivability of these wild populations. In addition, invasive species have also introduced zoonotic diseases and increased competition for resources. 

In an effort to maintain the survivability of Stephens’ banded snakes, the NSW government has registered this species under the landscape management section of the ‘Saving Our Species program’, by way of the Biodiversity Conservation Act of 2016 No. 63. This was done in order to establish a recovery strategy to reconnect and revegetate the species' fragmented habitats.

Captivity 
The New South Wales government permits the private ownership of these snakes. The NSW Native Animal Keepers Species List of 2016 specifies that individuals need to register with the Department of Planning, Industry and Environment in order to acquire either a R3, R4 or R5 Level license. In order to obtain this level of licensing for the legally ownership of Stephens' banded snakes, keepers must provide proof of a first-aid certificate, an escape proof enclosure, a lockable room, an emergency response plan as well as references that confirms the applicant's experience and skills in handling venomous reptiles.

Ex situ observations of this species has revealed that Stephens' banded snakes, when kept in captivity, can potentially grow larger and reproduce more rapidly than their wild counterparts as a result of consistent food availability.

References

Further reading
Boulenger GA (1896). Catalogue of the Snakes in the British Museum (Natural History). Volume III., Containing the Colubridæ (Opisthoglyphæ and Proteroglyphæ) ... London: Trustees of the British Museum (Natural History). (Taylor and Francis, printers). xiv + 727 pp. + Plates I-XXV. (Hoplocephalus stephensii, p. 350).
Cogger HG (2014). Reptiles and Amphibians of Australia, Seventh Edition. Clayton, Victoria, Australia: CSIRO Publishing. xxx + 1,033 pp. . (Hoplocephalus stephensii, p. 902).
Wilson, Steve; Swan, Gerry (2013). A Complete Guide to Reptiles of Australia, Fourth Edition. Sydney: New Holland Publishers. 522 pp. .

Fauna of New South Wales
Hoplocephalus
Reptiles described in 1869
Snakes of Australia